The 2014–15 Calgary Flames season was the 35th season in Calgary and 43rd for the Flames franchise in the National Hockey League (NHL). Entering the second year of a rebuilding phase, the Flames began the season with low expectations as nearly every pundit predicted the team would finish near the bottom of the League standings.

Jiri Hudler and Sean Monahan tied for the team lead with 31 goals, while Hudler led the team with 45 assists and 76 points. Johnny Gaudreau tied the Ottawa Senators' Mark Stone for the rookie scoring lead with 64 points, while free agent acquisition Jonas Hiller was the Flames' leading goaltender with 26 wins and a goals against average (GAA) of 2.36. Gaudreau and team captain Mark Giordano both played in the 2015 NHL All-Star Game, and Calgary's top selection at the 2014 NHL Entry Draft, Sam Bennett, made his NHL debut in the team's last game of the year, recording his first point with an assist in his first shift, 33 seconds into the contest.

Off-season
The 2014–15 season is the first for Brad Treliving as Flames' general manager. He succeeded Brian Burke, who acted as interim general manager following the dismissal of Jay Feaster the previous season. Treliving was active during the free agency period, and signed three players on July 1, 2014: Cochrane, Alberta, native Mason Raymond; goaltender Jonas Hiller; and defenceman Deryk Engelland. The Flames lost leading goal-scorer Michael Cammalleri, who signed a five-year contract with the New Jersey Devils.

The Flames played nine exhibition games during training camp. One contest, held September 24 against the Arizona Coyotes, was played in Sylvan Lake after the central Alberta town won the Canadian Broadcasting Corporation's annual Kraft Hockeyville competition. The Flames won the contest score of 4–3; Curtis Glencross scored the winning goal in overtime.

Regular season

October–November
The Flames entered the second season of their rebuild with low expectations.  The Calgary Sun sports writers predicted finishes between 27th and 29th overall in the 30-team NHL, while the Calgary Herald writers predicted finishes between 12th and 14th place in the 14-team Western Conference. Nationally, The Hockey News predicted the team would finish seventh, and last, in the Pacific Division. In spite of the predictions, the Flames' rebuilding efforts were viewed positively by all three publications, particularly after Head Coach Bob Hartley built the team into one with a reputation of being a hard working club that consistently forced their opposition to earn wins. Fans and media expressed excitement over the arrival of 2014 top draft pick Sam Bennett along with the arrival of Hobey Baker Award winner Johnny Gaudreau from the NCAA. The excitement was tempered somewhat on the eve of the season's start when it was revealed that Bennett had suffered a shoulder injury during the pre-season that potentially required surgery, which would sideline him for several months.

The Flames' season opened on October 8, a 4–2 defeat on home ice against the Vancouver Canucks. The team began a six-game road trip the following night as newly acquired forward Mason Raymond spoiled the Edmonton Oilers' season opener by recording a hat-trick – including his 100th career goal – in a 5–2 victory. The team won four games on the trip, including a 2–1 overtime victory over the Chicago Blackhawks where goaltender Jonas Hiller made 49 saves on 50 shots. The Flames concluded October with a five-game homestand and a series of injuries to top players: Mason Raymond (upper body), Matt Stajan (knee) and Mikael Backlund (abdominal strain) were all placed on injured reserve in the final week of the month, prompting the team to recall Markus Granlund and Micheal Ferland from the American Hockey League (AHL)'s Adirondack Flames. Ferland was himself injured during his NHL debut after being checked in the head by Anton Volchenkov of the Nashville Predators. Volchenkov received a four-game suspension for the incident.

Calgary began November by winning three games out of a five-game, eastern road trip before returning home to defeat the Arizona Coyotes, 5–3, on November 13. The victory was the 1,500th in Flames' franchise history. Wins over the Ottawa Senators and the Pacific Division-leading Anaheim Ducks followed, and the Flames ended the first quarter of their season with a 12–6–2 record, just one point behind Anaheim for the Division lead. The unexpected strong start earned the Flames considerable praise, particularly when Calgary's rebuild was compared to that of the Edmonton Oilers, who again languished at the bottom of the Western Conference. The play of team captain Mark Giordano earned praise across the League; Hockey Night in Canada Don Cherry argued that Giordano, who scored 18 points in his first 16 games, should be considered a favourite for the James Norris Memorial Trophy as the NHL's top defenceman. The Flames were also one of the best third period teams in the NHL at the one-quarter mark, having scored a League-leading 27 goals in the final frame, while giving up just 12. That resulted in the team also leading the NHL in wins when trailing after two periods, with four, and reinforced the team's reputation as being one of the hardest working squads in the League.  However, the Flames also were consistently outshot in the first quarter and the team's shooting percentage and save percentage were viewed by some, such as The Globe and Mail James Mirtle, as being unsustainable, even as he argued there were many positives for the team. The Flames continued winning as November came to an end, as goaltender Karri Ramo recorded consecutive shutout wins to end the month; 2–0 over the San Jose Sharks on November 27 and 3–0 over the Arizona Coyotes two nights later. With the victories, the Flames entered December with a 15–8–2 record and trailed Division co-leaders Anaheim and Vancouver by one point.

December–January
Bob Hartley won his 400th NHL game as a coach with a 4–3 overtime victory over one of his former teams, the Colorado Avalanche, on December 4. The Flames overcame a third period deficit for the sixth time on the season to earn the victory, and were led by Dennis Wideman's two goals as he moved into the NHL's lead amongst defencemen, with ten. A couple weeks after reaching the milestone, on December 17, the Flames announced that Hartley had agreed to a multi-year contract extension with the team.

The month of December quickly turned to disaster for the Flames, as they endured an extended losing streak; Calgary lost seven consecutive games in regulation, the longest such streak for the franchise since 1974, when the team was still located in Atlanta. The Flames, who were the highest-scoring team in the Western Conference when the streak began, scored only 11 goals during the seven regulation losses. The team finally earned a point, though they lost their eighth consecutive game, following a 3–2 overtime loss to Vancouver on December 20. The streak finally ended on December 22, the Flames' final game before the Christmas break. Calgary spotted the Los Angeles Kings a 3–0 lead before Gaudreau recorded a natural hat-trick, the first of his NHL career, as his three consecutive goals tied the game before Giordano won in overtime, 4–3.

Gaudreau scored another two goals, 16 seconds apart, to lead the Flames to a 4–1 victory over Edmonton in Calgary's first game following the Christmas break. Gaudreau's five goals in two games were enough for the NHL to name him the League's First Star of the Week of December 22–28. The Flames ended 2014 on a four-game winning streak and holding the final wild card playoff spot in the West after posting another pair home victories against Los Angeles and Edmonton. The New Year's Eve win over Edmonton, 4–3 in overtime, was the eighth game Calgary had won despite trailing at the start of the third period.

The Flames entered the break for the 60th National Hockey League All-Star Game by winning four games on a five-game road trip.  Their lone loss was the final game of the trip, a 6–3 defeat at the hands of the Anaheim Ducks. It was the 20th consecutive loss at Anaheim's Honda Center for the Flames, a streak that dated back to the 2003–04 season. The Flames reached the break with a 25–19–3 record, fourth in the Pacific Division and held the final playoff spot in the Western Conference. Two Flames players were selected to participate in the All-Star Game festivities: Mark Giordano was selected to play the game, while Johnny Gaudreau was one of six rookies named to participate in the skills competition. Gaudreau was promoted to the main line-up on the eve of the contest as an injury replacement.

February–April
A six-game home stand followed the All-Star break; Calgary won four contests before splitting a two-game California road trip. Throughout the stretch of games, the Flames were one of three teams, along with Vancouver and San Jose, battling for second, third and fourth places in the Pacific Division; they defeated the Sharks twice during the stretch, and then returned home to defeat Vancouver on February 14 to begin a four-game homestand. Two nights later, the Flames overcame a three-goal deficit to defeat the Boston Bruins 4–3. The result was their tenth win when trailing at the start of the third period – they trailed 3–1 at the second intermission. It extended the team's franchise record (previously seven such victories, set in 1986–87) and moved the team within two of the Dallas Stars' NHL record of 12, set in 2005–06.

The Saddledome hosted the 2015 Brier, Canada's national men's curling championship, in the first week of March, which forced the Flames into a seven-game road trip. The Flames dropped the first contest, 1–0, to the New York Rangers on February 25 before rebounding to defeat the New Jersey Devils, 3–1, the following night. The game had devastating consequences for the team, however, as Giordano suffered a completely torn biceps tendon, ending his season. The loss of Giordano came days before veteran forward Curtis Glencross was traded to the Washington Capitals. Despite this, the Flames were successful on the road trip as they won four games. In one contest, a 4–3 shootout victory on March 5 over Boston, defenceman Kris Russell set an NHL record with 15 blocked shots. He went on to break the NHL record of 273 blocks in one season early in April.

The trip ended on March 8 in Ottawa, where Calgary overcame a 4–0 deficit in the third period to tie before ultimately losing in a shootout. It was only the fourth time in franchise history that the Flames came back from at least four goals down in the third to earn at least one standings point; the most recent was October 17, 1989, when Calgary scored five third period goals to earn an 8–8 tie against the Quebec Nordiques. Offensively, the Flames were led by Jiri Hudler, who was named the NHL's First Star for the Week of March 2–8 after recording eight points in the team's final four games of the road trip.

As March gave way to April, the Flames continued to battle the Kings, as well as the Winnipeg Jets, for control of the final two Western Conference playoff spots; Calgary's offence was paced in March by Hudler, who led the NHL with 23 points for the month. He was named the NHL's Second star of the Month, while Gaudreau was named Rookie of the Month for the second time after leading all first-year players with 16 points in March.

An April 1 victory over the Oilers in Edmonton not only completed a five-game season sweep of Calgary's provincial rivals, but marked the team's 22nd victory on the road and tied a franchise record set in 1988–89. Two nights later, the Flames also completed a season sweep of Arizona with a 3–2 win in Calgary; Sean Monahan's 31st goal of the season stood as the game-winning goal. It was his eighth such winner during the campaign, and made the 20-year-old only the fifth player in NHL history to score eight game winners in one season before the age of 21 (Wayne Gretzky, Pierre Turgeon, Eric Lindros and Sergei Samsonov being the others). On the same night, the Oilers dealt a critical blow to the Los Angeles' playoff chances with a 4–2 victory in Edmonton.  The pair of results gave Calgary a two-point edge on the Kings and a chance to clinch a playoff spot as the teams met on April 9 in the penultimate game for each team. Led once again by Hudler and Gaudreau, who combined to score all three of the Flames' goals, Calgary defeated Los Angeles 3–1. The victory not only clinched the Flames' first post-season berth in six years, but also eliminated the defending Stanley Cup champion Kings from playoff contention. The regular season ended with a 5–1 defeat against the Winnipeg Jets. Three players made their NHL debuts in the contest: John Ramage, Brett Kulak and top draft pick Sam Bennett, who recorded his first NHL point just 33 seconds into the game by assisting on a goal from Micheal Ferland.  The Flames finished the season in third place in the Pacific Division with a record of 45–30–7.

Playoffs
Calgary's ascension to the 2015 Stanley Cup playoffs was one of the NHL's most unlikely stories for the season; only one member of the sports media, TSN's Aaron Ward, predicted the Flames would make the post-season and he did so on the argument that "there is always one team that surprises, and Calgary is it." By virtue of finishing third in the Pacific Division, the Flames drew a first-round playoff match-up against the second place Vancouver Canucks. It was the first post-season meeting between the two teams since the opening round of the 2004 playoffs, which Calgary won in seven games

Continuing their third period success from the regular season, the Flames began the series with a third period rally in Vancouver; they scored twice to overcame a 1–0 deficit entering the third period; first, David Jones scored to tie the game eight minutes into the third, and then, Kris Russell's game-winning goal came with less than 30 seconds remaining in regulation time. The Canucks evened the series with a decisive 4–1 victory in Game 2, the end of which was marred by a line brawl in which Deryk Engelland was assessed three game misconduct penalties, and Vancouver's Dan Hamhuis was ejected for being third man into a fight. Returning to the Saddledome for the first playoff game in Calgary since April 27, 2009, the Flames took a 2–1 series lead with a 4–2 victory in Game 3. Sam Bennett scored his first NHL goal, a tally which stood as the game winner. The end of the game was again marred by violence, as Bennett was struck in the head by Hamhuis, while Vancouver's Alex Burrows was ejected for hitting Johnny Gaudreau from behind before instigating a fight with Russell. Burrows was involved in a frightening incident during practice the next day: He was taken to hospital, and ruled out of the rest of the series, after experiencing pain later revealed to be the result of a broken rib.

The series settled down somewhat in the following two games as Calgary won Game 4 by a 3–1 score before the Canucks, facing elimination, responded with a 2–1 victory on their home ice in Game 5. As the series progressed, Flames' rookie Micheal Ferland became one of the most popular players on the team as a result of his physical play, and his battles with Canucks defenceman Kevin Bieksa in particular. Bieksa attempted to trivialize Ferland's impact by calling him "irrelevant." Ferland had a significant impact on the sixth game of the series, in Calgary, however. After the Canucks stormed out to a 3–0 lead less than ten minutes into the game, Ferland started a Flames comeback by converting a pass from Matt Stajan late in the period. Calgary's top line of Monahan, Gaudreau and Hudler then combined for four goals and ten points as the Flames stormed back to tie the game twice before Matt Stajan scored the eventual series-winning goal in a 7–4 Flames victory. Ferland ended the scoring with an empty net goal with three seconds to play. The series victory was the first for the Flames since 2004 and set up a second round match-up with the Anaheim Ducks.

The Flames continued their streak of futility in the Honda Center as they dropped the first two games by 6–1 and 3–0 scores; Karri Ramo took over goaltending duties from Jonas Hiller after the first game and made his first NHL playoff start in the second contest. The Flames' play improved as the series shifted to Calgary, but the Flames continued to face adversity, trailing 3–2 late in the third period. Sam Bennett appeared to have scored the tying goal on a puck that appeared to barely cross the goal line. The play was sent to video review, but was ruled inconclusive and no-goal in a result eerily similar to an infamous no-goal call from the sixth game of the 2004 Stanley Cup Final, also in Calgary. However, the Flames overcame the call as Gaudreau tied the game with 19.5 seconds remaining in the third period before Mikael Backlund won it at 4:36 of overtime. It was the only victory of the series for the Flames, as they lost game four by a 4–2 score, and were eliminated in Game 5 after dropping a 3–2 decision in overtime.

Standings

Schedule and results

Pre-season

Regular season

Playoffs

Player statistics
Final stats

Skaters

Goaltenders

†Denotes player spent time with another organization before joining Flames. Statistics reflect time with the Flames only.
‡Traded mid-season. Statistics reflect time with the Flames only.

Awards and honours
In recognition of their unexpected season, the Flames led the NHL with four nominees for major season-end awards. Bob Hartley became the first Flame to be named coach of the year as he won the Jack Adams Award. Jiri Hudler won the Lady Byng Memorial Trophy as the most gentlemanly player in the NHL. Johnny Gaudreau was a finalist for the Calder Memorial Trophy as rookie of the year, but finished third in voting behind Mark Stone of Ottawa, and the winner, Aaron Ekblad of Florida. Gaudreau received 33 first place votes. Gaudreau joined the other two players as a member of the NHL All-Rookie Team. Mark Giordano was nominated for the NHL Foundation Player Award for community service, but lost to Brent Burns.  Giordano also finished sixth overall in voting, with one first place vote, for the James Norris Memorial Trophy as top defenceman despite missing the final quarter of the season due to injury.

Awards

Milestones

Transactions

Player re-signings

Trades

Additions and subtractions

Draft picks

The Flames entered the 2014 NHL Entry Draft with the fourth overall selection. It is the highest the Flames have ever picked in their 35 years in Calgary, and the highest in franchise history since Tom Lysiak as chosen second overall by the Atlanta Flames in 1973.  With the selection, the Flames chose centre Sam Bennett from the Kingston Frontenacs.  Bennett was the top-ranked North American skater in the draft according to the NHL Central Scouting Bureau, and his playing style has been compared to that of Hockey Hall of Famer Doug Gilmour.  Calgary opted to draft larger players throughout the draft; after choosing goaltender Mason McDonald in the second round, the team added six-foot, seven-inch tall Hunter Smith, also in the second round, and added three other players over six feet, two inches tall.

Statistics are updated to the end of the 2014–15 NHL season. † denotes player was on an NHL roster in 2014–15.

Draft notes
  The Colorado Avalanche's second-round pick went to the Calgary Flames as the result of a trade on March 5, 2014, that sent Reto Berra to Colorado in exchange for this pick.
 The Calgary Flames' fourth-round pick went to the Toronto Maple Leafs as the result of a trade on September 29, 2013, that sent Joe Colborne to Calgary in exchange for this conditional pick.
 Condition – Third round if Colborne scores 10 goals or 35 points during 2013–14 season and if Flames qualify for 2014 playoffs, else fourth round – was converted on March 30, 2014.
 The Calgary Flames' fifth-round pick went to the St. Louis Blues as the result of a trade on July 5, 2013, that sent Kris Russell to Calgary in exchange for this pick.
 The Calgary Flames' sixth-round pick went to the Dallas Stars as the result of a trade on November 22, 2013, that sent Lane MacDermid to Calgary in exchange for this pick.
  The Anaheim Ducks' sixth-round pick went to the Calgary Flames as the result of a trade on November 21, 2013, that sent Tim Jackman to Anaheim in exchange for this pick.

Adirondack Flames
After five seasons of play in Abbotsford, British Columbia, the city opted to terminate its lease with the Flames' American Hockey League (AHL) affiliate, the Abbotsford Heat. The city paid $5.5 million to cancel the deal, part of $12 million in losses the city suffered during the team's tenure. As a result, the Flames announced that the franchise would relocate to Glens Falls, New York, for the 2014–15 AHL season and renamed the Adirondack Flames.

References

Calgary Flames seasons
Calgary
Calgary
Calgary Flames
Calgary Flames